Panegyra micans is a species of moth of the family Tortricidae. It is found in Kenya.

The wingspan is about 9 mm. The ground colour of the forewings is light grey and the costa broadly edged white dotted with brownish grey. There is a slender white elongate blotch dotted with brownish grey from the dorsal part of the termen, followed by a curved row of grey dots limiting the apex area. The hindwings are brownish grey.

References

Moths described in 2005
Tortricini
Moths of Africa
Taxa named by Józef Razowski